The Symphony No. 4 in E-flat major, Op. 48, was written by Alexander Glazunov in 1893. The symphony was a departure from Glazunov's three earlier symphonies, which were based on nationalistic Russian tunes and, according to the composer, allowed him to give "personal, free, and subjective impressions of myself."

History 
The symphony is dedicated to Anton Rubinstein, a fellow composer and pianist, and has three movements compared to Glazunov's regular four. Glazunov finished the symphony on 4 December 1893, and it was premiered at the Third Russian Concert at the Hall of Nobility on 22 January 1894. The premiere was conducted by Nikolai Rimsky-Korsakov, another eminent Russian composer, who declared the work "marvellous, noble, expressive". Later, Glazunov's daughter, Elena Glazunova-Gunther, would tell her biographer that the Fourth Symphony was the favorite Glazunov symphony in Europe, while the Fifth was favored in America.

Structure 
Three movements make up the work:

External links

1893 compositions
Symphonies by Alexander Glazunov
Compositions in E-flat major